The Contemporary Theater Company (CTC) is a 501(c)3 non-profit theater company based in South Kingstown, Rhode Island. Founded by Artistic Director Christopher J. Simpson in 2005, the company presents a range of plays throughout South County with an emphasis on reaching first-time theatergoers. The company presents an annual holiday show at the historic waterfront Towers in Narragansett and produces an annual 24-Hour Play Festival at the South Kingstown High School. The company presents theater, classes and public events at a theater at 327 Main Street in historic downtown Wakefield that opened in July 2012.

History 

The Contemporary Theater Company started as an unincorporated group in 2005 known as The Courthouse Summer Theater Company. Its first production was Rumors by Neil Simon in the summer of 2005. The company incorporated on May 30, 2006. The company continued to present shows under the name The Courthouse Theater Company at the Courthouse Center for the Arts until the end of 2007, when the center established an in-house theater group.

In 2009, The Courthouse Theater Company renamed itself The Contemporary Theater Company. It has since produced shows including The Complete Works of William Shakespeare (Abridged) and The Gift of the Magi.

Past Seasons

2013 season
8th Annual 24 Hour Play Festival
Springboard Season 
God's Ear by Jenny Schwartz
Fuddy Meers by David Lindsay-Abaire
A Flea in Her Ear by George Feydeau, translated by David Ives
Bob by Peter Sinn Nachtrieb
Testing Testing 1234 with the South Kingstown High School Drama Club
Assassins (musical) by Stephen Sondheim

2012 season
7th Annual 24 Hour Play Festival
Your Friends and Neighbors Present: Paradise Park by Charles Mee
Is He Dead? by Mark Twain
The Foreigner by Larry Shue
The Cmpleat Wrks of Wllm Shkspr (abridged) by The Reduced Shakespeare Company
Testing Testing 1234 with the South Kingstown High School Drama Club
The Tempest by William Shakespeare 
Willy Wonka and the Chocolate Factory by Roald Dahl - in partnership with GEAR productions
The Gift of the Magi by Andy Hoover

2011 season
6th Annual 24 Hour Play Festival
Romeo and Juliet by William Shakespeare
Composition by Andy Hoover
30 Neofuturist Plays from Too Much Light Makes the Baby Go Blind by The Neofuturists
Red Herring by Michael Hollinger
Peter Pan by Shawn Fennell
Testing Testing 1234 with the South Kingstown High School Drama Club
Eurydice by Sarah Ruhl
Mrs. Bob Cratchit's Wild Christmas Binge by Christopher Durang

2010 season
5th Annual 24 Hour Play Festival
The Last Five Years by Jason Robert Brown
The Real Inspector Hound by Tom Stoppard
The Glass Menagerie by Tennessee Williams
Waiting for Godot by Samuel Beckett
Rumors by Neil Simon
Alice's Adventures in Wonderland by Lewis Carroll - in partnership with GEAR Productions
The Gift of the Magi by Andy Hoover

2009 season
4th Annual 24 Hour Play Festival 
The Complete Works of William Shakespeare by The Reduced Shakespeare Company
Noises Off by Michael Frayn
Arsenic and Old Lace by Joseph Kesselring
Metamorphoses by Mary Zimmerman
The Gift of the Magi by Andy Hoover

2008 season
3rd Annual 24 Hour Play Festival
Color Theory - an original production
30 Neofuturist Plays from Too Much Light Makes the Baby Go Blind by The Neofuturists

2007 season
2nd Annual 24 Hour Play Festival
The Matchmaker by Thornton Wilder
Set & Drift by Andy Hoover

2006 season
24 Hour Play Festival
Proof by David Auburn
You Can't Take It with You by George S. Kaufman and Moss Hart

2005 season
Rumors by Neil Simon

Awards and nominations
"Rhode Island Monthly Editor's Pick"
2012 Arts Revitalization Award

Providence Phoenix: The Best of RI 2011
Best Theater Company (won)

MoreTeeth's Most Teeth Theater Awards May 2010 - May 2011
Best Play (Drama): Romeo and Juliet (nominated)
Waiting for Godot (nominated)

Best Director: Ryan Hartigan, Waiting for Godot (won)
Amy Lee Connell, Shawn Fennell, Nevan Michael Richard & Christopher J. Simpson, Romeo and Juliet (nominated)

Best Dramatic Performance (Female): Amy Lee Connell, Romeo and Juliet (nominated)
Best Dramatic Performance (Male): Stephen Strenio, Waiting for Godot (won)
Best Supporting Dramatic Performance (Female): Amy Lee Connell, Romeo and Juliet (nominated)
Best Supporting Dramatic Performance (Male): Maxwell Matthews, Waiting for Godot (nominated)

2011 Motif Magazine Theatre Awards
Best Supporting Male: Christopher J. Simpson, Waiting for Godot (won)

Southern Rhode Island Chamber of Commerce's 2011 Chamber Impact Awards
Excellence in Innovation Award (won)

Providence Phoenix: The Best of RI 2010
Best New & Yummy Theater Troupe (won)

2009 Motif Magazine Theatre Awards
Best Supporting Female: Meghan Rose Donnelly, Noises Off (nominated)

Organization 

The CTC is led by an eleven-member board of directors and Artistic Director Christopher J. Simpson. In 2009, Simpson won a fellowship from Princeton University to help grow the company.

References

External links 
 The Contemporary Theater Company

Theatre companies in Rhode Island
 
South Kingstown, Rhode Island
2005 establishments in Rhode Island